The Tapauá River is a river of Amazonas state in north-western Brazil. It is a left tributary of the Purus River.

The river flows through the Juruá-Purus moist forests ecoregion.

See also
List of rivers of Amazonas

References

Rivers of Amazonas (Brazilian state)